Idelette Stordeur de Bure Calvin (born 1500, died 1549) was the wife of the French reformer John Calvin (Jean Cauvin).

Life
Idelette de Bure was born in Liège and first married John Stordeur from the same city.  At some stage they moved to Strassburg where they were recorded as being Anabaptists. Idelette and John Stordeur had two children (Charles, Judith) before Stordeur died after a brief illness, leaving Idelette a widow.

Calvin was so caught up in his labors that he did not seem to consider marriage until age 30 or so. He asked friends to help him find a woman who was "chaste, obliging, not fastidious, economical, patient, and careful for (his) health". His fellow laborer Martin Bucer had known Idelette and recommended her to Calvin in confidence that she would fit the bill.  They married in August 1540.

Idelette bore Calvin one son and possibly a few daughters, all of whom died in infancy. In response to the slander of Catholics who took this for a judgment upon them for being heretics, Calvin said he was content with his many sons in the faith. Idelette busied herself attending to Calvin in his many illnesses, faithfully visiting the sick and afflicted, and making her home a refuge for those who fled for their lives and their faith.

Though she survived the plague when it ravaged Geneva, Idelette died after a lengthy illness in 1549. Upon her deathbed she was patient, and her words, edifying, e.g.: "O God of Abraham, and of all our fathers, in thee have the faithful trusted during so many past ages, and none of them have trusted in vain. I also will hope".

Calvin on Idelette

What Calvin wrote to Pierre Viret some days after her death will illustrate her character further. 

and,

Notes

See also

John Calvin
Anabaptist

References
 Bainton, Roland (1974). Women of the Reformation in England and France. Boston, MA: Beacon Press. .
 Good, James I. (1901, 2007). Famous Women of the Reformed Church. Birmingham, AL: Solid Ground Christian Books. ≈
 Schaff, Philip. "History of the Christian Church" Vol. VIII. Work info: History of the Christian Church, Volume VIII: Modern Christianity. The Swiss Reformation - Christian Classics Ethereal Library
 "Complete Works of Rev. Thomas Smyth, D.D." (1908). Appendix VI
 Edna Gerstner (1963/1992). ``Idelette ``. Publishing House, Grand Rapids, Michigan.

External links
The Highway - Idelette de Bure

1549 deaths
Dutch Calvinist and Reformed Christians
1500 births